The science of yoga is the scientific basis of modern yoga as physical exercise in human sciences such as anatomy, physiology, and psychology. Yoga's effects are to some extent shared with other forms of exercise, though it differs in the amount of stretching involved, and because of its frequent use of long holds and relaxation, in its ability to reduce stress. Yoga is here treated separately from meditation, which has effects of its own, though yoga and meditation are combined in some schools of yoga.

Yoga has been studied scientifically since the 19th-century physiology experiments of N. C. Paul. The early 20th-century pioneers Yogendra and Kuvalayananda both set up institutes to study yoga systematically.

Yoga helps to maintain bone strength, joint mobility, and joint stability. It improves posture, muscle strength, coordination, and confidence, in turn reducing the risk of injury and bone fracture. As it is generally slow and conducted with awareness, it may be safer than many other sports; but some postures such as headstand, shoulderstand, and lotus position have been reported as causes of injury.

Yoga is also used directly as therapy, especially for psychological conditions such as post-traumatic stress disorder, but the evidence for this remains weak. Yoga has sometimes been marketed with pseudoscientific claims for specific benefits, when it may be no better than other forms of exercise in those cases; and some claims for its effects on particular organs, such as that forward bends eject toxins from the liver, are entirely unfounded. Reviewers have noted the need for more high-quality studies of yoga's effects.

History 

In the 19th century, the Bengali physician N. C. Paul began the study of the physiology of yoga with his 1851 book Treatise on Yoga Philosophy, noting that yoga can raise carbon dioxide levels in the blood (hypercapnia).

Early in the 20th century, two pioneers of yoga as exercise in India, Yogendra and Kuvalayananda, worked to make Haṭha yoga acceptable, seeking scientific evidence for the health benefits of yoga postures (asanas) and yoga breathing (pranayama). In 1918, Yogendra founded The Yoga Institute to carry out research on yoga, hoping that a gloss of science would make yoga more acceptable in the West. Yogendra expressed his intentions in books such as his 1928 Yoga Asanas Simplified and his 1931 Yoga Personal Hygiene. In 1924, Kuvalayananda founded the Kaivalyadhama Health and Yoga Research Center, combining asanas with gymnastics, and like Yogendra seeking a scientific and medical basis for yogic practices.

In 1937, the Yale physiologist Kavoor T. Behanan published his book Yoga: A Scientific Evaluation, reporting that a form of pranayama, Ujjayi ("Victorious breath"), performed at the slow rate of 28 breaths in 22 minutes, could create a deeply relaxed state that he called "an extremely pleasant feeling of quietude", accompanied by a marked slowing of mental performance on tests such as mental sums, recognising colours and solving simple puzzles. The science journalist William Broad notes that this finding contradicted the image of yoga as conferring special powers.

In 1970 Christopher Hills, his son John, and Kevin Kingsland organized the 'World Conference on Scientific Yoga' in New Delhi, bringing 50 Western scientists together with 800 of India's leading swamis, yogis and lamas to discuss their research and establish a network for the creation of a World Yoga University.

Scope

Yoga as exercise is defined by Merriam-Webster as "a system of physical postures, breathing techniques, and sometimes meditation derived from [traditional] Yoga but often practiced independently especially in Western cultures to promote physical and emotional well-being".

The science journalist William Broad notes that yoga has "wide health benefits", and defines the scope of the science of yoga as to "better understand what yoga can do and better understand what yoga can be". He distinguishes "the modern variety" which is his subject from the Haṭha yoga that formed "in medieval times". Denise Rankin-Box, editor of Complementary Therapies in Clinical Practice, one of several Elsevier journals that publish papers on the effects of yoga (among other matters), offers the definition "research addressing the impact of yoga on health and wellbeing." Ann Swanson, an educator and yoga therapist, writes that "scientific principles and evidence have demystified so much of the practice" of yoga; her book on the Science of Yoga is principally about the anatomy of yoga asanas, with a chapter on the relationships of the body's systems (anatomy and physiology) to yoga. Psychiatric researchers such as Michaela Pascoe have addressed the effect of yoga on measures of psychological stress and depression.

Broad notes the "diffuse nature of the existing science" with pieces of the metaphorical jigsaw puzzle of scientific knowledge of what yoga actually achieves held in many laboratories around the world. The picture is, Broad writes, confused by the "predatory behaviour" of commercial ventures intent upon promoting themselves; but is being clarified by the American National Institutes of Health, which began funding scientific research into yoga in 1998, leading to reliable reports of studies of yoga's effects on different conditions.

Physical effects

Skeleton and joints 

Yoga helps to keep bones and joints in a healthy state. In particular, it helps to maintain bone strength; it also helps to maintain both joint mobility (range of motion), and joint stability. It improves posture, muscular strength, coordination and confidence (reducing anxiety), all of which reduce the risk of injury and bone fracture, and which may therefore be helpful to people with conditions such as osteoporosis. On the other hand, yoga, like any other physical activity, can result in injury; headstand (Sirsasana), shoulder stand (Sarvangasana), and lotus position (Padmasana) are the asanas most often reported as causes of injury. Ann Swanson offers three reasons why yoga may be safer than many sports, namely that it is often slow; it encourages awareness in the moment; and it stresses doing no harm (ahimsa). The American National Institutes of Health advise practising with a qualified instructor to reduce the chance of injury.

Muscles 

Yoga involves both isotonic activity, the shortening of muscles under load, and (unlike many forms of exercise) also a substantial amount of isometric activity, holding still under load, as in any asana which is held for a period. Isometric exercise builds muscle strength.

One of the applications of science to yoga is the provision of detailed knowledge of the anatomy of the skeletomuscular system, as it relates to yoga asanas, for yoga teachers and yoga therapists.

Breathing 

Breathing and posture affect each other, especially through their effects on the diaphragm. Breathing also affects the autonomic nervous system; quiet breathing slows the heart and reduces blood pressure. Together, these produce a feeling of calmness and relaxation. One way to do this is used in one form of yoga breathing (pranayama): the exhalation is counted to be twice as long as the inhalation, say inhale to a count of 3 and exhale to a count of 6.

Breathing can equally be used to energise the body. The pranayama method of bhastrika (bellows breath) and the satkarma purification of kapalabhati (skull polishing) both energise the body with vigorous abdominal breathing, using the diaphragm to make the abdomen move in and out.

Broad notes the "myth" that yoga, and especially pranayama, increases the supply of oxygen to the body. He writes that instead, fast vigorous breathing as with bhastrika may indeed feel exhilarating, as B. K. S. Iyengar reported, but it lowers the level of carbon dioxide in the blood. This causes blood vessels in the brain to constrict, reducing the brain's uptake of oxygen, resulting in symptoms such as dizziness and fainting. On the other hand, slow pranayama can raise carbon dioxide levels, and increase the uptake of oxygen by the brain.

Physiological effects

Fitness 

Yoga can be used as exercise to help maintain physical fitness. A complete yoga session with asanas and pranayama provides on average a moderate workout. Surya Namaskar (the 12-asana Salute to the Sun sequence) ranged from light to vigorous exercise, depending on how it was performed. The average for a session of yoga practice without Surya Namaskar was light or moderate exercise.

Cardiovascular health

A 2012 survey of yoga in Australia notes that there is "good evidence" that both yoga on its own, and its associated healthy lifestyle—often vegetarian, usually non-smoking, preferring organic food, drinking less or no alcohol—are beneficial for cardiovascular health, but that there was "little apparent uptake of yoga to address [existing] cardiovascular conditions and risk factors". Yoga was cited by respondents as a cause of these lifestyle changes; the survey notes that the relative importance of the various factors had not been assessed.

Stress relief 

Yoga sessions often end (and sometimes also begin) with a period of relaxation in corpse pose, Shavasana. The activity levels of all the body's muscles, and the motor neurons (nerve cells) that activate them, is reduced as relaxation is practised, except for the diaphragm which is used in breathing; and the breathing rate reduces also.

Yoga has other measurable effects that may be beneficial; for example, it reduces the level of the stress hormone cortisol.

As therapy 

There is strong scientific evidence that yoga is a safe and effective additional therapy for people with low back pain.  On its own, yoga is about as effective as other active treatments for back pain, and more effective at reducing pain and improving function than non-exercise treatments.

Yoga is useful to some extent for psychological conditions such as stress and depression, but despite repeated attempts, little or no evidence for benefit for other specific medical conditions. Much of the research on the therapeutic use of yoga, including for depression, has been in the form of preliminary studies or clinical trials of low methodological quality, suffering from small sample sizes, inadequate control and blinding, lack of randomization, and high risk of bias. For example, study of trauma-sensitive yoga has been hampered by weak methodology.

Pseudoscience

The neurologist and sceptic Steven Novella wrote in 2013 that "Yoga .. fits into a more general phenomenon of marketing a specific intervention as if it has specific benefits, when in fact it only has generic benefits" associated with physical exercise.  Novella points out that yoga also has a spiritual side, so claims made for it can mix science with "a liberal dose of pure pseudoscience and mysticism." He illustrates this by quoting unfounded claims such as that a forward bend squeezes the pancreas and liver, ejecting toxins, and that stretching the lower back is calming because emotional stress accumulates in the lower back muscles. Novella states that "None of those specific claims is based in reality." 

The practice of yoga for children was lacking rigorous study in 2014.

Notes

References

Books

Scientific papers

Other

Book sources 

 
  originally titled Yoga: A Scientific Evaluation.

External links
 Yoga: What You Need To Know, from the National Center for Complementary and Integrative Health

Modern yoga